The Brass Rail is a restaurant in Hoboken, New Jersey. Other than its cuisine, the restaurant is well known for supposed paranormal activity.

Description
The Brass Rail is a two-story restaurant located in historic downtown Hoboken, at 135 Washington Street. Originally built and opened around the turn of the 20th century, it has for many years been known for its raspberry beer, as well as its French cuisine. Residents of Hoboken recommend the Brass Rail to visitors, although the restaurant does retain a local crowd. In the late 1970s and early 1980s, the Brass Rail was frequented by many poets, during an emerging literary revival period in Hoboken. They would hang out there, drink, and discuss their art. The restaurant in the 1980s was owned by Michael Peters, and the building underwent a devastating fire. It was reportedly caused by a careless smoker; the damage forced the building to close down, and Michael Peters sold the restaurant and opened up another restaurant in Kinsale, Ireland.

By 1989, the Brass Rail was rebuilt and featured etched-glass doors, red velvet banquettes and painted cherubs along the ceiling. The first floor holds the pub, while formal dining in a French salon style is on the second floor. Hanging on one of the walls of the Brass Rail is a large oil mural depicting the history of Hoboken. It has been restored to its original 1900s style, and a wooden spiral staircase wraps around the wall facing Washington Street, which along the ground floor has been revamped into a part of a lounge.

Paranormal activity
Supernatural occurrences have been reported and investigated at the Brass Rail. According to the legend, on their wedding day in 1904, the bride of a newlywed couple had approached the top of the spiral staircase and tripped. She fell from the second floor, broke her neck, and died. The groom, devastated by the loss of his new wife, began drinking heavily. After taking his last drink, he hanged himself in a room adjacent to the staircase. Found at the bar area where he sat was a suicide note:

Near and along the circular staircase, which is still the original one that the deaths occurred by, is where the spirits of the couple, as well as others, are reported to haunt.

It has been reported as the site of a variety of supernatural and bizarre happenings, and it is said to host the spirits of not just the bride, who wanders up and down the staircase, and the despairing groom, but also of other wedding guests. Witnesses have typically been the waiters and waitresses at the Brass Rail, who claim to have seen the ghosts of the couple, usually late at night when they are cleaning up. Other bizarre occurrences said to have happened include phone calls with no one answering on the other line, trays falling to the ground, hearing voices, and the misplacement of items. The upscale restaurant has also grabbed the interest of people seeking paranormal activity, and according to a manager in 2005, every October a group of people come to examine the site.

Some of the staff remain skeptical, while some believe that the restaurant shows qualities that are otherworldly.

In October 2004, the New Jersey Ghost Hunters Society investigated the Brass Rail. Devices used in the investigation included an EMF reader and a tape recorder; the former used to measure electric charge fluctuations and the latter to capture  potential EVP occurrences. Photographs were also taken, and while the EMF reader did not see any abnormal changes and the tape recorder recorded no EVPs, after the photographs were developed a week later, one taken along the staircase revealed a floating wisp of smoke. It was reported that there was no smoke in the room, and the picture has been interpreted by the society as "an indication of an ethereal presence".

Reviews
A New York Times review called the Brass Rail "very good." Zagat has rated it as excellent.

References

Sources

External links

Restaurants in New Jersey
Buildings and structures in Hoboken, New Jersey
Companies based in Hudson County, New Jersey
Reportedly haunted locations in New Jersey